Chandler's Purchase is a township located in Coös County, New Hampshire, United States. The purchase lies entirely within the White Mountain National Forest. As of the 2020 census, the purchase had a population of zero. It is the smallest township by area in Coos County.

In New Hampshire, locations, grants, townships (which are different from towns), and purchases are unincorporated portions of a county which are not part of any town and have limited self-government (if any, as many are uninhabited).

History 

Geography 
None of the area is covered by water other than by streams such as the Ammonoosuc River, which flows through the purchase.

Two roads cross the purchase. Base Station Road leads east to the Marshfield Base Station of the Mount Washington Cog Railway in neighboring Thompson and Meserve's Purchase and west to Bretton Woods. The hiker parking lot for the Jewell Trail and the Ammonoosuc Ravine Trail, both of which afford access to the summit of Mount Washington, is along the road in Chandler's Purchase. The second road in the purchase, Jefferson Notch Road, is a dirt road which leads north from Base Station Road over Jefferson Notch to the Israel River valley in the town of Jefferson.

Demographics 

As of the 2020 census, there were no people living in the purchase.

References

Townships in Coös County, New Hampshire
Berlin, New Hampshire micropolitan area
Townships in New Hampshire